Nemer ibn el Barud (1925-2010) was an Argentine poet of Lebanese descent.

Life and career
Nemer ibn el Barud was born in the province of San Juan, Argentina in 1925. Later on, he moved to Buenos Aires. There, he studied Communication Sciences. During his time in San Juan he worked in the Faculty of Social Sciences. He died on October 17, 2010 in Buenos Aires, Argentina.

Works
 "Astroliquen"
 "Credo del Caminante" 
 "Deolinda correa" 
 "Hombre Nuestro que estas en la Tierra"
 "Monosilabos" 
 "Por Amor Al Amor"

References

Argentine male poets
Romantic poets
People from San Juan Province, Argentina
Argentine people of Lebanese descent
1925 births
2010 deaths
Date of birth missing